Lazar Jovisić (born January 18, 1989) is a Serbian football goalkeeper who plays with Jedinstvo Stara Pazova.

Career
Born in Inđija, SR Serbia, he begin his career in 2006 when he became a senior at FK Jedinstvo Stara Pazova.  He made 33 appearances for Jedinstvo in the 2006–07 season in the Serbian League Vojvodina and that called the attention of Serbian SuperLiga side FK Borac Čačak which brought him into their main team in summer 2007.  However, he did not get any chances to play so by the winter break of the 2007–08 season he decided to move abroad and joined Portuguese Primeira Liga side C.D. Nacional.  He stayed in Madeira until 2010, however he failed to make a debut in the league.  In summer 2010 he moved to Bulgaria and signed with A PFG side PSFC Chernomorets Burgas however he was loaned to second level PFC Chernomorets Pomorie during the 2010–11 season.  During the winter break of the 2011–12 season, after 4 years abroad, he returned to Serbia and joined the team where he had made his senior debut, FK Jedinstvo Stara Pazova.

References

External links
 

1989 births
Living people
People from Inđija
Serbian footballers
Association football goalkeepers
FK Borac Čačak players
FK Inđija players
C.D. Nacional players
PFC Chernomorets Burgas players
Serbian expatriate footballers
Expatriate footballers in Portugal
Expatriate footballers in Bulgaria